Embreea is a genus of orchids native to Colombia and Ecuador. The genus Embreea is abbreviated as Emb in horticultural trade. There at present (June 2014) two recognized species:

Embreea herrenhusana (Jenny) Jenny (2002) - Ecuador  (syn Embreea rodigasiana var. herrenhusana Jenny (2001))
Embreea rodigasiana (Claes ex Cogn.) Dodson (1980) - Colombia  (syn Stanhopea rodigasiana Claes ex Cogn. (1897))

References

External links
 
 

Stanhopeinae
Orchids of Colombia
Orchids of Ecuador
Stanhopeinae genera